In medicine, the Faget sign—sometimes called sphygmothermic dissociation—is the unusual pairing of fever with bradycardia (slow pulse). (Fever is usually accompanied by tachycardia (rapid pulse), an association known by the eponym "Liebermeister's rule".) The Faget sign is named after Louisiana physician Jean Charles Faget, who studied yellow fever in Louisiana. 

Faget sign is often seen in:
Yellow fever
Typhoid fever
Brain abscess
Tularaemia
Brucellosis
Colorado tick fever
Some pneumonias - Legionella pneumonia and Mycoplasma pneumonia
Drug fever (e.g. beta-blockers, known as the Beta-Faget sign)

Of note, the Faget sign in bacterial infections is consistently associated with bacteria that have an intracellular life cycle.

References

Medical signs